Nick Griffin (born 1959) is a British politician.

Nicholas or Nick Griffin may also refer to:

Nick Griffin (comedian), American comedian
Nicholas Griffin (philosopher), Canadian philosopher

See also
Nick Griffiths
Nicholas Griffith
Nicola Griffith